The Brunei Cup was an annual basketball tournament held at Brunei from 2001 until 2008. First held in 2001, with most of the teams coming from Overseas Filipino workers in Brunei, the tournament has since expanded to include several professional and national teams around Asia and Australia. The games were held at Brunei's National Indoor Stadium.

Tournament results

External links
Official website

International club basketball competitions
Sport in Brunei
Basketball competitions in Asia